Asura strigatula is a moth of the family Erebidae. It is found in India.

References

strigatula
Moths described in 1913
Taxa named by Walter Rothschild
Moths of Asia